Sir Thomas Alston, 3rd Baronet (c. 1676 – December 1714) was an English Member of Parliament.

Thomas Alston was the eldest son of Sir Rowland Alston, 2nd Baronet of Odell, Bedfordshire and Temperance Crew; the family included Puritans on both sides. He was educated at Trinity College, Cambridge.

Alston succeeded his father as Baronet in 1697. From 1698 to 1701 he was MP for Bedford: it is unclear with which of the Parliamentary groupings his sympathies lay. He died unmarried, probably in London, in December 1714. "The story that he had wasted his estate and at the time of his death was a prisoner in the Fleet is not borne out by his will, in which the Odell estate and other property in Bedfordshire was left intact and charged with numerous bequests".

References

1676 births
Year of birth uncertain
1714 deaths
Alumni of Trinity College, Cambridge
Baronets in the Baronetage of England
English MPs 1698–1700
English MPs 1701
People from the Borough of Bedford